Opuntia atrispina is a cactus species in the genus Opuntia. It has limited distribution in the United States. In Texas it can be found from near Uvalde to Del Rio/Langtry—a small strip of area just 50 miles long.

Description
The epithet of this species means "black-spined", denoting the fact that its spines are dark-brown to black at least in the lower part.

The flowers on these small shrubs are special because they open pale yellow (sometimes almost white) and darken with age to rose. Thus, the plants can be adorned with flowers of multiple colors: cream, yellow, salmon, and rose. Newly opened flowers can even have a hint of green in the middle. The spines too are special because they are yellowish at the tips but dark brown at the bases.

References

External links
Opuntia atrispina photo gallery at Opuntia Web

atrispina